Deinanthe caerulea, the false hydrangea, is a species of plant from the genus Deinanthe in the family Hydrangeaceae. It was first described by Otto Stapf in 1911.

The blue false hydrangea is a perennial, herbaceous plant that reaches heights of 30 to 50 centimeters. It forms a rhizome. The leaves are opposite. The leaf blade is broadly elliptical, ovate, or obovate, and measures 10 to 25 × 6 to 16 centimeters, has two columns at the top and serrated on the edge. The inflorescence consists of fertile and sterile flowers. The fertile flowers have 6 to 8 blue, lilac blue or light red petals. Stamens are numerous. The stamens and anthers are light blue.

The flowering time is in July and August.

Occurrence
The blue false hydrangea occurs in China in western Hubei in damp forests at altitudes of 700 to 1600 meters.

Use
The blue false hydrangea is rarely used as an ornamental plant for groups of trees. It needs a partially shaded, cool location with humus soil.

References

Hydrangeaceae